Geoffrey Burton (23 July 1885 – 16 June 1981) was a British hurdler. He competed in the men's 400 metres hurdles at the 1908 Summer Olympics.

References

External links
 

1885 births
1981 deaths
Athletes (track and field) at the 1908 Summer Olympics
British male hurdlers
Olympic athletes of Great Britain
Place of birth missing